The School District of Beloit is a school district in the county of Rock County, Wisconsin serving the City of Beloit. The School District of Beloit educates and nurtures close to 7,100 students in 6 elementary schools with limited class sizes, 4 intermediate schools and 1 high school. Four-year-old kindergarten, alternative programming and charter schools are available. The superintendent is Dr. Garrison.

Schools

High schools
Beloit Memorial High School

6-12 Schools
Beloit Learning Academy

Intermediate schools
 McNeel Intermediate School
 Aldrich Intermediate School
 Cunningham Intermediate School 
 Fran Fruzen Intermediate School

Elementary schools
 Beloit Early Learning
 Gaston 
 Hackett
 Robinson
 Todd
 Merrill
 Converse

References
www.sdb.k12.wi.us

External links
School District of Beloit District Website
School District of Beloit District News

School districts in Wisconsin
Education in Rock County, Wisconsin
School District